Shefflin is a surname. Notable people with the surname include:

 Evan Shefflin (born 1999), Irish hurler
 Henry Shefflin (born 1979), Irish hurling manager and former player
 Paul Shefflin (1980–2022), Irish hurler